The Royal Titles Act 1901 (1 Edw 7 c 15) was an act of the Parliament of the United Kingdom. It authorised the alteration of the British monarch's royal style to reflect the United Kingdom's other colonial possessions.

The royal proclamation made by virtue of the act, issued on 4 November 1901, added the words "and of the British Dominions beyond the Seas" to the royal title in English after "Ireland", and "" in Latin.

The addition was removed from the monarch's title by a proclamation made under the Royal Titles Act 1953.

See also 

 Royal Style and Titles Act

References 

United Kingdom Acts of Parliament 1901
Titles in the United Kingdom
1901 in the British Empire